Gregory John Feist (born December 23, 1961) is an American psychologist and Professor of Psychology at San Jose State University. He has published in the psychology of creativity, personality, psychology of science, motivated reasoning, the psychology of science, and the development of scientific talent.

Early life and education 
Gregory J. Feist was born in Lawrence, Kansas. His father was a professor of psychology and education at McNeese State University in Lake Charles, LA, where Feist grew up.

Feist earned a degree in psychology from the University of Massachusetts, Amherst in 1985. His senior honors thesis under Seymour Epstein, on the relationship between self- and other-perception in children, was published in the Journal of Personality and Social Psychology.

Career
From 1991 to 1995 Feist was assistant professor at San Jose State University and from 1995 to 2002 assistant and associate professor of psychology at the College of William & Mary.  He was on the faculty at the University of California, Davis from 2002 to 2006.  Since 2006 Feist has been on the faculty at San Jose State University, where he is full professor of psychology.

Research contributions

Psychology of creativity
Feist has extended the work conducted on the personality influences of creative achievement. He was the first to publish a quantitative meta-analysis of the literature on personality and creativity in the arts and sciences. With Frank Barron, Feist conducted a 44-year follow up of Berkeley graduate students, most of whom went on to have careers in the sciences. They found that personality predicted lifetime creative achievement over and above intellect and potential. In 2019, Feist published a functional theory of creativity that argues that having personality traits of high in openness to experience, introversion, self-confidence functions to lower the threshold for creative thought and achievement. He has applied evolutionary theory and sexual selection pressures to explain why people find artistic creativity a sexually attractive trait. Along with Daniel Dostal and Victor Kwan, Feist conducted an extensive analysis of the lifetime incidence of nearly 20 different forms of mental illness in creative artists, writers, musicians, and scientists and found elevated rates of affective disorder and chemical dependency in artists compared to norms, athletes, and creative scientists.

Psychology of science
Beginning with his dissertation in 1991, Feist has been a leading figure in the fledging field of the psychology of science.
 The first major paper from the dissertation research was published in 1993 and its main findings revealed that observer rated hostility, arrogant working style, and intrinsic motivation were the major influences on scientific productivity and eminence. Collaborating with Michael Gorman, Feist published a systematic review of the scientific literature on the psychology of science.

In 2006, Feist published the Psychology of Science and the Origins of the Scientific Mind. He then helped found the International Society for the Psychology of Science & Technology as well as becoming founding Editor-in-Chief of the Journal of Psychology of Science & Technology.

Feist has investigated the development of scientific talent in winners of the Science Talent Search as well as members of the National Academy of Sciences. Feist found that lifetime scientific achievement was predicted by early expression of talent, early scientific productivity, gender, and immigrant status.

Selected publications

Academic books
 Feist, G.J.  (2006). The Psychology of Science and the Origins of the Scientific Mind. New Haven, CT: Yale University Press.  
 Feist, G.J. & Gorman, M.E. (Editors) (2013). Handbook of the Psychology of Science.  New York: Springer Publishing. 
 Feist, G.J., Reiter-Palmon, R., & Kaufman, J.C. (Editors) (2017). Cambridge Handbook of Creativity and Personality Research. New York, NY: Cambridge University Press.

Textbooks
 Feist, G.J., & Rosenberg, E.L. (2019). Fundamentals of Psychology: Perspectives & Connections. Boston: McGraw-Hill.  
 Feist, G.J. Roberts, T.A., Feist, J. (2021). Theories of Personality (10th edition). McGraw-Hill [translated into Chinese, and Spanish & Tagalog] 
 Feist, G.J., & Rosenberg, E.L. (2022). Psychology: Perspectives & Connections (5th edition). Boston: McGraw-Hill.

Selected awards
 Winner, 2007 William James Book Award, Division 1 General Psychology, American Psychological Association, for The Psychology of Science and the Origins of the Scientific Mind
 Berlyne Award 2000, Division 10, American Psychological Association

References

External links
 Homepage

Living people
1961 births
University of California, Berkeley alumni
American atheists
San Jose State University faculty
College of William & Mary faculty
21st-century American psychologists
University of Massachusetts Amherst alumni
People from Lawrence, Kansas
People from Lake Charles, Louisiana
University of California, Davis faculty
Scientists from Kansas
Scientists from Louisiana
20th-century American psychologists